Conyers is a surname. Notable people with the name include:
 Brad Conyers, drummer for The Ziggens
 Christopher Conyers, 2nd Baron Conyers (died 1538)
 David Conyers (born 1971), Australian science fiction writer
 Edward Conyers (fl. 1725-1734), English member of parliament for East Grinstead
 Evelyn Conyers (1870–1944), Australian Army nurse
 Herb Conyers (1921–1964), American baseball player
Ian Conyers (born 1988), American politician
 John Conyers (1929–2019), a U.S. Representative from Michigan
 John Conyers (politician, born 1650) (1650–1725), English member of parliament East Grinstead and West Looe
John Conyers (politician, born 1717) (1717-1775), English member of parliament for Essex and Reading
 John Conyers, 3rd Baron Conyers (before 1538–1557), English aristocrat
 Sir John Conyers, 1st Baronet (died 1664), of the Conyers baronets
 Sir John Conyers, 3rd Baronet (1649–1719), of the Conyers baronets
 Monica Conyers (born 1964), American politician
 Sir Reginald Conyers (1879–1948), Bermudian lawyer and politician
 Thomas Conyers (c. 1666–1728), English member of parliament
Thomas Conyers (fl. 1590), founder of Conyer's School, Yarm, Yorkshire, England
 William Conyers, 1st Baron Conyers (1468–1524), English nobleman

See also
Conyers baronets
Conyers (given name)